{{DISPLAYTITLE:C9H6O}}
The molecular formula C9H6O may refer to:

 Indenone
 Isoindenone
 2-Ethynylbenzaldehyde
 2,3-Di(1-propynyl)-2-cyclopropen-1-one
 Phenylpropynal

Molecular formulas